Perecesi Torna Klub was a Hungarian football club from Pereces, district of Miskolc.

History
Perecesi Torna Klub debuted in the 1946–47 season of the Hungarian League and finished fifteenth.

Name Changes 
1923–1949: Perecesi TK
1949–1951: Perecesi Tárna TK
1951–1957: Perecesi Bányász SK
1957–1958: Perecesi TK
1958–1959: Perecesi Bányász
1959–1975: Miskolci Bányász

References

External links
 Profile

Football clubs in Hungary
Defunct football clubs in Hungary
1923 establishments in Hungary
Mining association football clubs in Hungary